Robert Rogers may refer to:

Politics
Robert Rogers (Irish politician) (died 1719), Irish politician, MP for Cork City 1692–1699
Robert Rogers (Manitoba politician) (1864–1936), Canadian politician
Robert Rogers, Baron Lisvane (born 1950), Chief Executive and Clerk of the House of Commons of the United Kingdom
Robert Gordon Rogers (1919–2010), Canadian Lieutenant Governor of British Columbia
Robert Louis Rogers, former Canadian ambassador to Israel

Other
Robert Rogers (British Army officer) (1731–1795), American colonial officer, explorer, and playwright
Robert Empie Rogers (1813–1884), American chemist
Robert Montresor Rogers (1834–1895), Irish recipient of the Victoria Cross
Robert Rogers (novelist), American writer under the pen names of Lee Rogers, Jean Barrett, and Jean Thomas
Sir Robert Hargreaves Rogers (1850–1924), Sheriff of the City of London
Robert Athlyi Rogers (1891–1931), author of the Holy Piby, an important foundational text in Rastafarian theology
Bobby Rogers (1940–2013), American Motown singer, songwriter, member of The Miracles

See also 
Robert L. Rodgers (1875–1960), U.S. Representative from Pennsylvania
Bob Rogers (disambiguation)
 Rogers (surname)